Chandralekha is a 1997 Indian Malayalam-language comedy film written and directed by Priyadarshan which is an adaptation of an English movie called  While you Were Sleeping (1995) and produced by Fazil. It stars Mohanlal, Sukanya, Pooja Batra, Sreenivasan, Nedumudi Venu, and Innocent. The film's title is a portmanteau of the two female lead characters' names—Chandra and Lekha. Berny Ignatius composed the songs, while the film score was composed by S. P. Venkatesh. The film's core plot was inspired by the 1995 Hollywood film While You Were Sleeping.

Plot 
Appukuttan Nair is a struggling unemployed youth who arrives in Mumbai to meet his sister and brother-in-law. His father has been falsely implicated in a bank fraud and wants to sell his ancestral property to pay towards the litigation. For that he needs his sister's approval, but is abused and turned away by his brother-in-law.

Disappointed, Appu seeks out his old pal Nooruddin, who is working in a fruit juice vending shop in Goa. Noor himself is a hapless uneducated youth working for his uncle Beeran, who is a treacherous money lender, with a hope to marry his daughter Maimoona. They plan to open a paint shop but need ₹1.25 lakh to rent a shop as prerequisite to get a bank loan. With no other way in sight, they swindle Beeran out of ₹1.25 lakh. Appukuttan then tries to get the loan sanctioned but he is rebuffed by a new Bank Manager Varghese who had taken charge by then.

In a turn of events, Appukuttan happens to rescue a woman named Chandrika Varma after a car accident, hospitalising her. Chandra is the daughter of a wealthy businessman, Udhaya Varma. Appukuttan is mistaken by the hospital staff to be her husband, Alfred Fernandes. Soon her relatives including her father arrive and they too mistake him for Chandra's husband, because Chandra had eloped with Alfie, and no one among them had ever seen or talked to Alfie. Also it happened to be that Chandra was a major client of Appukuttan's Bank Manager Varghese, who too mistook Appukkuttan for Chandra's husband, and was now eager to oblige him with the loan. Appukuttan decides to masquerade as Alfie till he gets loan approval from the Bank Manager. Chandra lay bedridden paralysed unable to react, but with her cognition intact was able to witness all the commotions around her.

Some of the relatives of Chandra were never convinced about Appukuttan from the outset. Beeran is also hot on Appukuttan's trail to retrieve his money. To make matters worse for Appukuttan, Chandra's close friend Lekha, a medical graduate comes to visit her father Iravi, who is Udhaya Varma's assistant. She had talked to Alfie on the phone previously and is immediately suspicious about Appukkuttan. The relatives join with Lekha to find out the truth. Lekha and others play cat and mouse with Appukuttan trying to uncover his veracity, with Appukuttan staying ahead of the game for a while. Finally Lekha discovers the real story of Appukuttan and she is moved by his plight and enamored by his openhearted nature.

In the meantime, Chandra revives from her paralysis and she too forgives Appukuttan for everything; she also developed a liking for him. One of the jealous relatives of Chandra manages to expose Appukkuttan before everyone. Then Chandra admits all the truth to everyone. Hers was not in fact a car accident but was a suicide attempt after her fiancé, the real Alfie, had betrayed her, and their marriage had never commenced. Chandra recovers fully under the loving care of Appu and Lekha. Chandra falls in love with Appukuttan and hopes to marry him. However, she discovers that Lekha was already in love with Appukuttan, and had in fact given way for her as a favour to Chandra's father, to whom Lekha was like a second daughter. Chandra gracefully withdraws from her planned marriage with Appukuttan, and Appukuttan and Lekha are united together with everyone's hearty blessings.

Cast 

 Mohanlal as Appukuttan Menon "Appu" or Alfred "Alfie"
 Sukanya as Chandrika Varma 
 Pooja Batra as Lekha
 Sreenivasan as Noordeen
 Nedumudi Venu as Udhaya Varma
 Innocent as Iravi pillai 
 M. G. Soman as  Dr. M. K B Menon
 Sukumari as Appachi
 Cochin Haneefa as Sathyapalan
 T. P. Madhavan as Balaraman, a doctor
 Reena as Shobha
 Augustine as Ravindran Nair
 Sadiq as Venu
 Mamukkoya as Beeran
 Kuthiravattam Pappu as Sankara Kurup
 Maniyanpilla Raju as Varghese
 Chandni Shaju as Maimuna
 Mini Arun as Indu
 Antony Perumbavoor as Santhosh, an office staff member
 Anil Kapoor as another 'Alfie' patient in a (cameo appearance)
 Vahini
 Mink Brar as Lead dancer (cameo appearance) in the song "Maanathe Chandiranothoru"

Production 
Chandralekha brought back after a couple of years the successful comedy combo of Mohanlal and Sreenivasan, which was popular in the late-1980s and early-1990s. The name "Chandralekha" is a portmanteau of the names of the two female lead characters in the story—Chandra and Lekha. Bollywood actor Anil Kapoor plays a cameo role in the film. He appears as a lunatic, whom Appukuttan misunderstands as the original Alfie. Manju Warrier was offered a role but she could not sign the film.

Soundtrack 
The blockbuster songs of this film were written by lyricist Gireesh Puthenchery. The songs are composed by the music director duo Berny Ignatius. The background score of the film was composed by S. P. Venkatesh. The song Innale Mayangunna is based on Bhanwara Bada Nadan Hain from Sahib Bibi Aur Ghulam. The song Maanathe Chandiranothoru was inspired from the famous Arabic artist Amr Diab's album Nour El Ain.

Box office
Upon release, Chandralekha became the highest-grossing Malayalam film ever.

Awards 
Mohanlal won the Screen Awards South for Best Actor for his performance in the film.

Remakes 
Chandralekha was remade into Telugu in the same name in 1998, with Nagarjuna reprising the role of Mohanlal. In 2000, it was remade in Hindi as Har Dil Jo Pyar Karega starring Salman Khan, directed by Raj Kanwar. It was remade in Kannada as Hey Sarasu starring Ramesh Aravind. The story has been adapted into Tamil as Summa Nachunu Irukku directed by A. Venkatesh.

References

External links 
 
 Chandralekha at the Mohanlal's Official Website

1990s Malayalam-language films
Films scored by Berny–Ignatius
1997 comedy films
1997 films
Films shot in Mumbai
Malayalam films remade in other languages
Indian comedy films
Films directed by Priyadarshan